Ana Rosa Núñez (July 11, 1926 – August 2, 1999) was a Cuban-American poet and librarian.  She authored over two dozen books of poetry, prose, and translations.

Biography 
Núñez was born in Havana, Cuba, to Dr. Jorge Manuel Núñez y Bengochea, a professor and architect, and Carmen Gónzalez y Gónzalez de Burgos. In 1949, she earned a scholarship from the Institute of International Education to attend the College of Wooster in the United States.  In 1955, she graduated from the University of Havana with a library degree.  In Cuba, she was head librarian of the National Audit Office (Tribunal de Cuentas de la Republica de Cuba, 1950-1961) and a founding member and vice president (1957-1959) of the Colegio Nacional de Bibliotecarios Universitarios.

Núñez came to the United States on September 10, 1965.  She and another Cuban exile librarian, Rosa M. Abella, were hired by the University of Miami's Otto G. Richter Library. There, she and other librarians helped build a significant collection of material involving Cuba and the Cuban exile community. In addition to traditional scholarly works, this included other publications and ephemera and significant donations such as notebooks, photographs, and the papers of the Cuban anthropologist Lydia Cabrera.

Núñez published numerous books of poetry, literary criticism, and anthologies. She has been called one of the most outstanding of the group of Cuban poets born around 1930.  She developed a particular interest in the Japanese haiku. She wrote a book of haiku in Spanish, Escamas del Caribe: Haikus de Cuba (1971), translated the work of American haiku authority Harold G. Henderson, and sent her haiku to the Emperor Hirohito on his birthday.

She died in Mercy Hospital in Miami of a brain hemorrhage at the age of 73.

Bibliography
Antología de la poesía religiosa de La Avellaneda. 
Antología de poesía infantil. 
Cartas al tiempo. 
Cinco poetisas cubanas, 1935-1969 : Mercedes Garcia Tuduri, Pura del Prado, Teresa Maria Rojas, Rita Geada, Ana Rosa Nuñez. 
Crisantemos = Chrysanthemums : (edición bilingüe, español/inglés). 
Ensayo de diccionario del pensamiento vivo de la Avellaneda. 
Escamas del caribe (Haikus de Cuba). 
Gabriela Mistral, amor que hirió. [Poesía]. 
Homenaje a Dulce María Loynaz : obra literaria, poesía y prosa, estudios y comentarios. 
Homenaje a Eugenio Florit : de lo eterno, lo mejor. , 
Hora doce. 
La Florida en Juan Ramón Jiménez. 
Loores a la palma real. 
Los oficia-leros. 
Poesía en éxodo : el exilio cubano en su poesía, 1959-1969. 
Sol de un solo día. 
Un día en el verso 59. 
Uno y veinte golpes por America. 
Viaje al Cazabe.

References

External links
Library and archival resources by or about Ana Rosa Núñez.

1926 births
1999 deaths
Cuban women poets
Cuban librarians
American women librarians
American librarians
Hispanic and Latino American librarians
20th-century Cuban poets
20th-century Cuban women writers
Cuban emigrants to the United States
20th-century American women
20th-century American people